Justin Zimmer (born October 23, 1992) is an American football defensive end for the Miami Dolphins of the National Football League (NFL). He played college football at Ferris State. Professionally, he has played for the New Orleans Saints, Atlanta Falcons, Cleveland Browns and the Buffalo Bills of the National Football League (NFL), in addition to the Montreal Alouettes of the Canadian Football League (CFL).

College career
Zimmer played four seasons for the Bulldogs, compiling a total of 216 tackles, 26 sacks, 48.5 tackles for a loss, 1 interception, 1 TD, 14 pass deflections, 9 forced fumbles, 1 fumble recovery, and 3 blocked kicks. He was a three time first-team All-GLIAC selection, a two time Division II All-American, and a three time Division II Academic All-American.

Professional career

Buffalo Bills
Zimmer signed with the Buffalo Bills as an undrafted free agent on May 6, 2016. He was waived by the Bills on August 30, 2016.

New Orleans Saints
On December 13, 2016, Zimmer was signed to the New Orleans Saints' practice squad. He signed a reserve/future contract with the Saints on January 2, 2017. He was waived on September 2, 2017.

Montreal Alouettes
Zimmer signed with the Montreal Alouettes of the Canadian Football League on September 21, 2017 and was added to the team's practice roster. He was promoted to the active roster and appeared in the Alouettes' final game of the season, recording three tackles and one sack.

Atlanta Falcons
On April 17, 2018, Zimmer was signed by the Atlanta Falcons. Zimmer made the Falcons' 53-man roster, and made his regular season debut in Week 3. He was waived by the Falcons on October 2, 2018 and was re-signed to the practice squad. On December 4, 2018, Zimmer was signed to the Falcons’ 53-man roster.

On August 31, 2019, Zimmer was waived by the Falcons and was signed to the practice squad the next day.

Cleveland Browns
On December 3, 2019, Zimmer was signed by the Cleveland Browns off the Falcons' practice squad. The Browns waived Zimmer with a non-football injury designation on July 31, 2020.

Buffalo Bills (second stint)

On August 16, 2020, Zimmer signed with the Buffalo Bills. He was waived on September 5, 2020, and signed to the practice squad the next day. He was elevated to the active roster on September 12 and October 19 for the team's weeks 1 and 6 games against the New York Jets and Kansas City Chiefs, and reverted to the practice squad the day after each game. He was signed to active roster on October 21.

In Week 8 against the New England Patriots, Zimmer made a key play late in the fourth quarter, punching the ball out of Patriots quarterback Cam Newton's hands on a quarterback keeper as New England was driving down the field to either tie or win the game. The forced fumble and recovery by teammate Dean Marlowe sealed a 24–21 Bills win.
In Week 10 against the Arizona Cardinals, Zimmer recorded his first career sack on Kyler Murray during the 32–30 loss.

On November 11, 2021, Zimmer was placed on injured reserve with a season-ending knee injury. He became a free agent after the season, but was re-signed to the Bills' practice squad on October 4, 2022.

Miami Dolphins
On November 23, 2022, Zimmer was signed by the Miami Dolphins off the Bills practice squad.

References

External links
Atlanta Falcons bio
Ferris State Bulldogs bio

1992 births
Living people
People from Greenville, Michigan
Players of American football from Michigan
American football defensive tackles
American players of Canadian football
Montreal Alouettes players
Atlanta Falcons players
Buffalo Bills players
Cleveland Browns players
Ferris State Bulldogs football players
New Orleans Saints players
Miami Dolphins players